Sväng is a Finnish quartet with each member of the group playing a harmonica and other mouth organ. They were formed in 2003 by Jouko Kyhälä and have released five albums since that date.

External links 
 Official website
 Jarruta (Hit the Breaks) review by The Guardian
 Jarruta review by Evening Standard

Finnish folk musical groups
Musical groups established in 2003